The People's Park is a park located by Pery Square in Limerick, Ireland, just west of the railway station and bus terminal. At the northern edge of the park is the Limerick City Gallery of Art.

History
The Park was initially developed as part of the Pery Square development in the Newtown Pery area of central Limerick. This development commenced in 1835 and the associated park was a key-holders only park. The intended plan was to surround the park with housing for the more affluent members of society. Pery Square was intended to be a complete Georgian square with the Georgian terraces enclosing a central park, similar in layout to Merrion Square or Mountjoy Square in Dublin, however more modest in scale. Ireland's Georgian economy began to decline with the onset of the Great Irish Famine and only one terrace of the square was ever completed  funds for the project ran out before this could be completed. The park was officially opened in 1877, it was given to the People of Limerick in honour of Richard Russell, a prominent local businessman. It was the then Earl of Limerick in the 1870s who granted a 500-year lease of Pery Square and the surrounding grounds to the corporation under certain conditions. These included an agreement that no political or religious meetings were allowed to be held in the park and bands were not to play there on a Sunday. The plots of land that were earmarked for the development of the Georgian Square were eventually incorporated into the park and extended it further north to what is now Mallow Street, eastwards towards Boherbuoy Road and southwards towards St. Joseph Street.

Amenities

The park boasts a number of interesting items including a memorial upon a giant pillar to Thomas Spring Rice, MP for the city of Limerick from 1820–1832, a 19th-century bandstand, an ornate drinking fountain (one of only two on the island of Ireland) and two gazebos.

Modern facilities include a playground opened in 2001 and memorial garden to The Little Angels of Limerick opened in 2002.

References

Related links
 People's Park on Limerick City Council website

Parks in County Limerick
Limerick (city)